Enno Penno (22 April 1930, in Tallinn – 16 November 2016, in Stockholm) was an Estonian politician, who was acting as Acting Prime Minister of Estonia in exile from 1 March 1990 to 20 June 1992.

See also
 Heinrich Mark

References

This article incorporates information from the equivalent article on the Estonian Wikipedia.

1930 births
2016 deaths
Politicians from Tallinn
Prime Ministers of Estonia
Recipients of the Order of the National Coat of Arms, 3rd Class
Estonian World War II refugees
Estonian emigrants to Sweden
20th-century Estonian politicians